Junction City Roller Dolls (JCRD) is a women's flat track roller derby league based in Ogden, Utah. Founded in 2008, the league consists of a WFTDA ranked travel team (Trainwrecks) and a team consisting of new skaters and other experienced skaters unable to travel often. Junction City is a member of the Women's Flat Track Derby Association (WFTDA).

History
The league was founded in June 2008, and had around thirty skaters by January 2009. In October 2010, it competed in the Mountain Throwdown tournament, finishing second to the Salt City Derby Girls.

Junction City was accepted into the Women's Flat Track Derby Association Apprentice Program in April 2010, and became a full member of the WFTDA in March 2011.

WFTDA rankings

References

Ogden, Utah
Roller derby leagues established in 2008
Roller derby leagues in Utah
Women's Flat Track Derby Association Division 3
2008 establishments in Utah